Chu River is a river of Anhui and Jiangsu, China.

References

Rivers of Anhui
Rivers of Jiangsu